Biola is a census-designated place (CDP) in Fresno County, California, United States. The population was 1,623 at the 2010 census, up from 1,037 in 2000.

Geography

History
Biola was founded by William Kerchoff in 1912. The name was an acronym of the "Bible Institute of Los Angeles". A post office operated in Biola from 1912 to 1918, and from 1920 to the present.

Demographics

2010
The 2010 United States Census reported that Biola had a population of 1,623. The racial makeup of Biola was 510 (31.4%) White, 6 (0.4%) African American, 43 (2.6%) Native American, 316 (19.5%) Asian, 2 (0.1%) Pacific Islander, 692 (42.6%) from other races, and 54 (3.3%) from two or more races. Hispanic or Latino of any race were 1,196 persons (73.7%).

The Census reported that 1,623 people (100% of the population) lived in households, 0 (0%) lived in non-institutionalized group quarters, and 0 (0%) were institutionalized.

There were 342 households, out of which 234 (68.4%) had children under the age of 18 living in them, 212 (62.0%) were opposite-sex married couples living together, 81 (23.7%) had a female householder with no husband present, 25 (7.3%) had a male householder with no wife present.  There were 25 (7.3%) unmarried opposite-sex partnerships, and 0 (0%) same-sex married couples or partnerships. 21 households (6.1%) were made up of individuals, and 10 (2.9%) had someone living alone who was 65 years of age or older. The average household size was 4.75.  There were 318 families (93.0% of all households); the average family size was 4.84.

The population was spread out, with 621 people (38.3%) under the age of 18, 225 people (13.9%) aged 18 to 24, 409 people (25.2%) aged 25 to 44, 263 people (16.2%) aged 45 to 64, and 105 people (6.5%) who were 65 years of age or older.  The median age was 23.8 years. For every 100 females, there were 102.4 males.  For every 100 females age 18 and over, there were 102.0 males.

The homeowner vacancy rate was 0.9%; the rental vacancy rate was 3.1%.  1,002 people (61.7% of the population) lived in owner-occupied housing units and 621 people (38.3%) lived in rental housing units.

2000
As of the census of 2000, there were 1,037 people, 224 households, and 202 families residing in the CDP. The racial makeup of the CDP was 13.50% Caucasian, 0.10% Black or African American, 2.51% Native American, 5.59% Asian, 0.48% Pacific Islander, 74.64% from other races, and 3.18% from two or more races.  82.45% of the population were Hispanic or Latino of any race.

There were 224 households, out of which 55.8% had children under the age of 18 living with them, 68.3% were married couples living together, 15.6% had a female householder with no husband present, and 9.4% were non-families. 8.5% of all households were made up of individuals, and 7.1% had someone living alone who was 65 years of age or older.  The average household size was 4.63 and the average family size was 4.78.

In the CDP, the population was spread out, with 36.5% under the age of 18, 12.7% from 18 to 24, 27.9% from 25 to 44, 13.1% from 45 to 64, and 9.7% who were 65 years of age or older.  The median age was 25 years. For every 100 females, there were 108.2 males.  For every 100 females age 18 and over, there were 106.3 males.

The median income for a household in the CDP was $32,667, and the median income for a family was $30,234. Males had a median income of $21,042 versus $14,464 for females. The per capita income for the CDP was $7,375.  About 24.9% of families and 25.9% of the population were below the poverty line, including 34.5% of those under age 18 and 20.4% of those age 65 or over.

Climate
Climate type occurs primarily on the periphery of the true deserts in low-latitude semiarid steppe regions.  The Köppen Climate Classification subtype for this climate is "BSk" (Tropical and Subtropical Steppe Climate).

See also
Biola Branch (Southern Pacific)

References

Census-designated places in Fresno County, California
Populated places established in 1912
1912 establishments in California
Census-designated places in California